Canta In Italiano is a 1968 album by Astrud Gilberto. The most promoted track was an Italian version of "Goodbye Sadness" by Alberto Testa, the theme of a Brazilian telenovela.

Track listing
Tristezza Per Favore Va Via (Goodbye Sadness) – 3:30
Castelli Di Sabbia (The Shadow of Your Smile) – 2:27
Aruanda – 2:16
Tristezza – 2:15
Gli Occhi Miei – 2:57
Malinconia (Manhã de Carnaval) – 1:53
La Banda – 3:00
Miro In Alto ... Voglio Te (I Had the Craziest Dream) – 2:17
Dammi Un'Idea (Summer Samba) – 2:37
Tu Non Mi Guardi Più (A Certain Sadness) – 3:07
Portami Con Te (Fly Me to the Moon) – 2:17
Un Milione, Un Miliardo – 2:12

References

1968 albums
Astrud Gilberto albums